Sidney Hawley (25 January 1909 – 1971) was an English professional footballer who played in the Football League for Mansfield Town.

References

1909 births
1971 deaths
English footballers
Association football forwards
English Football League players
Mansfield Town F.C. players
Bolsover Colliery F.C. players
Shirebrook Miners Welfare F.C. players
Sheffield Wednesday F.C. players
Stewarts & Lloyds Corby A.F.C. players